Reichmann, Reichman is a German and Yiddish surname. The name means that somebody is a very wealthy (rich) man; (reich = rich and mann = man) in German.

Notable people 
Notable people with the surname include:

 Eva Gabriele Reichmann (1897 - 1998), a German Jewish historian and sociologist
 Frieda Fromm-Reichmann (1889 - 1957), a German Jewish psychiatrist and psychoanalyst
 Gisela Reichmann, an Austrian figure skater
 Helmut Reichmann (1941 - 1992), a German glider pilot
 Jean-Luc Reichmann (born 1960), a French radio- and television host
 Josh Reichmann, a Canadian indie rock singer-songwriter
 Michael Reichmann (1944 - 2016), a Canadian photographer and entrepreneur
 Tobias Reichmann (born 1988), a German handball player
 Reichmann family, a Hungarian-Austrian Jewish family best known for controlling the Olympia and York business empire
 Edward Reichmann (1925 - 2005)
 Albert Reichmann (born 1929)
 Paul Reichmann (1930 - 2013), a Canadian businessman

Reichman 

 Harry Richman (born Harold Reichman)
 Marek Reichman (born 1966), an English automotive designer
 Rabbi Hershel (Zvi) Yosef Reichman, a US Orthodox rabbi
 Uriel Reichman (born 1942), Israeli professor of law, politician, and founder of Reichman University

See also 
 Rajchman (Polonised from)
 Richman
 Reich, Rajch, etc.

Jewish surnames
German-language surnames
Yiddish-language surnames